Opisthopatus natalensis is a species of velvet worm in the Peripatopsidae family. This species has 16 pairs of legs. The type locality is in South Africa. The validity of this species is uncertain: Although some authorities have deemed O. natalensis to be a subspecies of O. cinctipes, a similar species also found in South Africa, and others regard O. natalensis as invalid even as a subspecies, still other authorities recognize O. natalensis as a separate species, citing the significant distance (656 km) between the type localities of these two species.

References

Endemic fauna of South Africa
Onychophorans of temperate Africa
Onychophoran species
Invertebrates of South Africa
Animals described in 1900
Taxa named by Eugène Louis Bouvier